Tetracha biimpressicollis is a species of tiger beetle that was described by Mandl in 1960, and can be found only in Bolivia and Brazil.

References

Cicindelidae
Beetles described in 1960
Beetles of South America